Birdy Airlines was an airline based in Belgium that offered long-haul flights from Brussels to Africa on behalf of SN Brussels Airlines using a fleet of three Airbus A330-300 aircraft. The airline was founded in 2002 and ceased its operations in 2004 when it was merged into SN Brussels Airlines.

References

Defunct airlines of Belgium
Airlines established in 2002
Airlines disestablished in 2004
2004 disestablishments in Belgium
Belgian companies established in 2002